National Route 453 is a national highway of Japan connecting Toyohira-ku, Sapporo and Date, Hokkaido in Japan.

History
1 April 1993 - General National Highway 453 (from Sapporo to Date)

Overlapping sections
From Chitose to Date : Route 276

Municipalities passed through
Ishikari Subprefecture
Sapporo - Eniwa - Chitose
Iburi Subprefecture
Tomakomai - Date - Sobetsu - Date

References

National highways in Japan
Roads in Hokkaido